Renê Nazare-Azevedo, also known as simply Nazare, is a Brazilian professional mixed martial artist who previously competed Bellator's Lightweight division.

Background
Nazare is an MMA competitor and was previously a jiu-jitsu Instructor at Team Bombsquad. For twelve years, he dedicated himself to the art of Brazilian jiu-jitsu. Rene expressed talent and interest in jiu-jitsu at a young age and studied under 3rd degree black belt instructor, Rodrigo Antonio Garcia Da Silva.

As an experienced fighter for Nova Uniao Jiu-Jitsu Club and Club Feijao Jiu-Jitsu, four time medalist, and a nine year veteran instructor, Rene operates his own jiu-jitus gym in Falmouth, Massachusetts.

Mixed martial arts career
Nazare made his professional mixed martial arts debut in May 2004 where he defeated Thiago Cabelo at Body Fight 1 by TKO (Punches) in round 1. He then went on to win his next 6 fights to get him a fight in Bellator.

Bellator
In his Bellator debut, he fought PRIDE veteran Luiz Azeredo at Bellator 39 and won by TKO.

On April 27, 2011, it was announced that Bellator signed him and he will take place in the upcoming Season Seven Lightweight Tournament.  He faced Ricardo Tirloni in the opening round of the tournament on October 19, 2012 at Bellator 77. He lost the fight via submission in the second round.

Championships and accomplishments

Mixed martial arts
Reality Fighting
Reality Fighting Lightweight Championship (One time)

Submission grappling
International Brazilian Jiu-Jitsu Federation
2001 IBJJF World Jiu-Jitsu Championship Blue Belt Gold Medalist
Confederação Brasileira de Jiu Jitsu Olímpico
2007 CBJJO World Cup Black Belt Gold Medalist
2004 CBJJO World Cup Brown Belt Silver Medalist
2003 CBJJO World Cup Purple Belt Gold Medalist

Mixed martial arts record

|-
|Loss
|align=center|10–3
| Ricardo Tirloni
|Submission (D'arce choke)
|Bellator 77
|
|align=center|2
|align=center|1:14
| Reading, Pennsylvania, United States
|Bellator Season 7 Lightweight Tournament Quarterfinal
|-
|Loss
|align=center|10–2
| Thiago Michel
|Decision (split)
|Bellator 62
|
|align=center|3
|align=center|5:00
| Laredo, Texas, United States
|Bellator Season 6 Lightweight Tournament Quarterfinal
|-
|Loss
|align=center|10–1
| Jacob Kirwan
|Decision (unanimous)
|Bellator 54 
|
|align=center|3
|align=center|5:00
| Atlantic City, New Jersey, United States
|
|-
|Win
|align=center|10–0
| Juan Barrantes
|TKO (doctor stoppage)
|Bellator 48 
|
|align=center|2
|align=center|5:00
| Uncasville, Connecticut, United States
|
|-
|Win
|align=center|9–0
| Kalvin Hackney
|Submission (rear-naked choke)
|Bellator 45 
|
|align=center|1
|align=center|4:44
| Lake Charles, Louisiana, United States
|
|-
|Win
|align=center|8–0
| Luiz Azeredo
|TKO (arm injury)
|Bellator 39 
|
|align=center|1
|align=center|5:00
| San Jacinto, California, United States
|
|-
|Win
|align=center|7–0
| Jeff Anderson
|Submission (rear-naked choke)
|CFX 13: Rumble in the Jungle 5  
|
|align=center|1
|align=center|2:06
| Plymouth, Massachusetts, United States
|
|-
|Win
|align=center|6–0
| Muzaffar Abdurakhmanov
|Submission (armbar)
|FFP: Untamed 29  
|
|align=center|1
|align=center|3:07
| Marlborough, Massachusetts, United States
|
|-
|Win
|align=center|5–0
| Anthony Leate
|Submission (rear-naked choke)
|Reality Fighting: Throwdown  
|
|align=center|1
|align=center|2:51
| Plymouth, Massachusetts, United States
|
|-
|Win
|align=center|4–0
| Brian McLaughlin
|Decision (split)
|Reality Fighting: Apocalypse 
|
|align=center|3
|align=center|3:00
| Plymouth, Massachusetts, United States
|
|-
|Win
|align=center|3–0
| Vincent Sylvestre
|TKO (punches)
|FFP: Untamed 25  
|
|align=center|1
|align=center|4:03
| Boxborough, Massachusetts, United States
|
|-
|Win
|align=center|2–0
| Steve Barnett
|Decision (unanimous)
|Reality Fighting: Collision
|
|align=center|5
|align=center|5:00
| Plymouth, Massachusetts, United States
|
|-
|Win
|align=center|1–0
| Thiago Cabelo
|TKO (punches)
|Body Fight 1  
|
|align=center|1
|align=center|1:45
| Maringá, Brazil
|

References

Living people
Brazilian male mixed martial artists
Mixed martial artists utilizing Brazilian jiu-jitsu
Brazilian practitioners of Brazilian jiu-jitsu
People awarded a black belt in Brazilian jiu-jitsu
Sportspeople from Rio de Janeiro (city)
Sportspeople from Ithaca, New York
1982 births